The Ridge Trail Historic District near Kensington, North Dakota is a  historic district encompassing portions of the first major settler trail through Walsh and Pembina Counties.  It includes 8 segments of a rutted cart trail that was used to move people and supplies into the area from as far off as St. Paul, Minnesota.

The district was listed on the National Register of Historic Places in 2006.

References

Roads and trails on the National Register of Historic Places in North Dakota
Geography of Walsh County, North Dakota
Geography of Pembina County, North Dakota
Historic districts on the National Register of Historic Places in North Dakota
Transportation in Walsh County, North Dakota
Transportation in Pembina County, North Dakota
National Register of Historic Places in Pembina County, North Dakota
National Register of Historic Places in Walsh County, North Dakota
Trails and roads in the American Old West